Choplifter III is a shoot 'em up video game released for the Super Nintendo Entertainment System in 1994. It was the third Choplifter title starting with the original Apple II game released in 1982].

A portable version of the game was released for the Game Gear, but this version was actually a remake of Choplifter II. This version of the game was subsequently re-released for the Game Boy.

Gameplay
The gameplay revolves around piloting a rescue helicopter into hostile territory and rescuing hostages. The player's task is made more complicated by the limited number of hostages the helicopter can carry as well as increasing difficulty throughout the four chapters of the game. Each chapter is split into four collective stages and set in a different environment, starting off with jungle, desert, sea, and finally city.

The game also has a number of minibosses spread throughout the campaign.

Reception
GamePro gave the game a mostly positive review. Commenting on the beautiful graphics and addictive gameplay, they summarized that "this fast, great-looking game shouldn't be overlooked by fans of Desert/Jungle Strike." Electronic Gaming Monthly gave it a 7.8 out of 10, commenting that "Fans of military simulators will definitely feel at home with this one." In 1995, Total! ranked the game 92nd on their Top 100 SNES Games stating: "The graphics are laughably crude but after a while you’ll grow to love this shooter/rescue-‘em-up."

References

External links
 Choplifter III at superfamicom.org
 チョップリフターIII / Choplifter III at super-famicom.jp 
 

1993 video games
Game Boy games
Helicopter video games
Game Gear games
Ocean Software games
Horizontally scrolling shooters
Super Nintendo Entertainment System games
Video game sequels
Video games developed in Australia